Brian MacPhie and Nenad Zimonjić were the defending champions but only MacPhie competed that year with Chris Haggard.

Haggard and MacPhie lost in the quarterfinals to Davide Sanguinetti and Sargis Sargsian.

Mark Knowles and Daniel Nestor won in the final 6–2, 7–6(7–3) against Bob Bryan and Mike Bryan.

Seeds

Draw

External links
 2003 Kroger St. Jude International Men's Doubles Draw

2003 Kroger St. Jude International
Doubles